The Scottish Lowland Football League (SLFL, commonly known as the Lowland League) is a senior football league based in central and southern Scotland. The league sits at level 5 on the Scottish football league system, acting as a feeder to the Scottish Professional Football League, and is above three regional leagues at level 6.

Founded in 2013, it is currently composed of 19 member clubs in a single division. Geographically, the league covers an area south of Dundee in the Lowlands area of Scotland.

Since 2014-15, it has featured in the senior pyramid system. The winners take part in an end of season promotion play-off with the Highland Football League champions, with the winners then competing against the bottom club in Scottish League Two for a place in the SPFL. Promotion and relegation also exists between the three Lowlands-based regional leagues at level 6 (East, South, and West).

Format
Teams play each other twice in the league (home and away), receiving three points for a win and one point for a draw. No points are awarded for a loss. At the end of each season, the club with the most points is crowned Lowland League champions. If points are equal, goal difference, and then goals scored determines the champion. If this still does not result in a winner, the tied teams must take part in a championship play-off match at a neutral venue to determine the final placings.

Promotion and relegation
Since 2014–15, promotion to the Scottish Professional Football League is via an annual play-off, beginning with the Lowland League champions facing the champions of the Highland Football League over two legs (home and away). There is no away goals rule so if scores are equal on aggregate after full-time in the second leg, the game will go to extra time, and then penalties if required. The winners will then face a play-off against the bottom club in League Two with the same rules applying. If the League Two clubs loses the play-off final, they are relegated to the Lowland League if they are south of 56.4513N latitude (middle of the Tay Road Bridge).

Promotion to the Lowland League is via a three match round robin play-off between the winners of the East of Scotland Football League, South of Scotland Football League, and West of Scotland Football League, subject to their respective champions meeting league membership criteria. If two clubs meet the criteria they will face each other home and away, if only one club meets the criteria they will be promoted without a play-off, however if no club meets the criteria there will be no promotion to the Lowland League.

Based on the number of clubs remaining after the results of promotion to and from the league are known, the bottom and possibly second-bottom placed clubs will be relegated to the East of Scotland Football League, South of Scotland Football League, or West of Scotland Football League depending on their geographical location.

Scottish Cup
All Lowland League clubs are full members of the Scottish Football Association and qualify automatically for the first round of the Scottish Cup. The league champions and the runner-up receive a bye into the cup's second round.

The furthest a Lowland League team has reached in the Scottish Cup is the fifth round (last 16); The Spartans in 2014–15 (lost 1–0 to Berwick Rangers in a replay), East Kilbride in 2015–16 (lost 2–0 to Celtic) and BSC Glasgow in 2019–20 (lost 4–1 to Hibernian).

History
The Lowland Football League was intended on helping institute a football pyramid including promotion and relegation from Scottish football's national divisions down to its junior and amateur levels by the Scottish Football Association.

Formation 
The Lowland League was founded by a unanimous vote of members of the Scottish Football Association (SFA) on 11 June 2013, The league would be composed of teams drawn from the East of Scotland, South of Scotland, and junior leagues, who met on 17 June 2013 to elect between them the founder-members of the new league.

While most clubs were invited to submit bids to join, Preston Athletic, The Spartans and Threave Rovers were offered automatic entry as they were already fully licensed by the SFA. While 27 clubs had registered their interest, the Lowland League received 17 applications to join. After the meeting on 17 June, it was announced there would be 12 teams in the league, and that they would be: Dalbeattie Star, East Kilbride, Edinburgh City, Gala Fairydean Rovers, Gretna 2008, Preston Athletic, Selkirk, The Spartans, Threave Rovers, University of Stirling, Vale of Leithen, and Whitehill Welfare.

Expansion
Subsequent seasons saw the number of participating clubs increase. Two clubs, Edinburgh University and BSC Glasgow, were admitted to the league for the 2014–15 season. They were joined the following season by Cumbernauld Colts. Civil Service Strollers and Hawick Royal Albert joined in June 2016, making it a 16-team league.

Pyramid movement 
The end of the 2015–16 season was the first time that founding members would leave the league; Edinburgh City became the first club to be promoted to the SPFL, while Threave Rovers declined the opportunity to re-apply to the league after finishing bottom and rejoined the South of Scotland Football League. The same season also saw East Stirlingshire become the first club relegated into the league from Scottish League Two.

Another founding member would leave the league at the end of the 2016-17 season as Preston Athletic were relegated to the East of Scotland League. They were replaced by Edusport Academy who became the first club to gain promotion from the South of Scotland League.

In 2017–18 the first promotion play-off took place between the champions of the East of Scotland and South of Scotland leagues, with former SJFA East Region club Kelty Hearts winning 10–0 on aggregate over Threave Rovers to gain promotion.

Decline of Selkirk 
During the 2018–19 season Selkirk resigned their membership in the league owing to insurmountable difficulties. It was agreed by the Lowland League board that all fixtures played by and to be played by Selkirk in 2018–19 would be expunged from the record along with any other data involving Selkirk for that season. The Lowland League moved forward with 15 clubs, however Whitehill Welfare, who finished bottom in the season's competition, were still relegated to the East of Scotland League.  East of Scotland champions Bonnyrigg Rose were promoted to the league after gaining their SFA membership. Berwick Rangers became the second club to be relegated into the league from the SPFL, having lost the League Two play-off against Cove Rangers.

Impact of Covid 
At the start of the 2019–20 season Edusport Academy rebranded the club as the Caledonian Braves following a vote online by members of the Our Football Club.com project. The 2019–20 league season was suspended on 13 March 2020 due to the COVID-19 pandemic. A month later, the competition was ended with immediate effect with Kelty Hearts being declared champions on a points per game average based on the current standings. Vale of Leithen who were bottom of the league were also spared relegation.

WOSFL 
On 14 April 2020, the Lowland League announced it had approved 67 applications to join the new West of Scotland Football League, which included all 63 clubs from the Scottish Junior Football Association's West Region, and four others. Bonnyton Thistle already a member of the South of Scotland League decided to move due to being based in Kilmarnock. The West of Scotland League will act as a feeder league on the same tier as the East of Scotland Football League and South of Scotland Football League.

Kelty Hearts promotion 
The league consisted of 17 teams for the 2020–21 season with East of Scotland champions Bo'ness United being promoted after gaining their SFA membership in June 2020. The start of the league season was delayed until October 2020 because of the COVID-19 pandemic, and games were played behind closed doors due to Scottish Government restrictions. On 11 January 2021 the league was suspended by the Scottish Football Association due to the escalating pandemic situation. On 30 March the league announced that a majority of clubs had voted to curtail the season, with a points per game basis used to finalise standings and Kelty Hearts were declared as the champions. Kelty became the second Lowland League club to gain promotion to the SPFL after beating Brechin City 3–1 on aggregate in the Pyramid play-off final.

Colt teams 
Celtic and Rangers were approached by the Lowland League for a proposal to admit "B" teams (also known as "colt" teams) into the league for the 2021–22 season. The proposal was given provisional approval by the majority of member clubs with the vote being confirmed at the leagues AGM on 27 May 2021. This arrangement was renewed for the 2022–23 season, with Hearts also providing a B team.

Member clubs

Notes

Former members
Promoted to the SPFL
Edinburgh City, 2016;
Kelty Hearts, 2021;
Bonnyrigg Rose Athletic, 2022;
Relegated
Preston Athletic, 2017;
Hawick Royal Albert United, 2018;
Whitehill Welfare, 2019;
Vale of Leithen, 2022;
Resigned
Threave Rovers, 2016;
Selkirk, 2018; (Folded)

Seasons

* Team promoted to Scottish League Two
E Team relegated to or promoted from the East of Scotland Football League
S Team relegated to the South of Scotland Football League
† Season curtailed due to COVID-19 pandemic - Kelty were announced as champions for the 2019-20 and 2020-21 season. A points per game basis was used to finalise standings.

Top Scorers

Records
Biggest home win Kelty Hearts 11–0 Vale of Leithen, 14 December 2019, and Berwick Rangers 11–0 Vale of Leithen, 9 October 2021
Biggest away win Vale of Leithen 0–13 Bonnyrigg Rose, 6 October 2021
Most goals in a game The Spartans 11–2 Selkirk, 7 December 2013
Most points in a season 87; Bonnyrigg Rose, 2021-22
Fewest points in a season 5; Selkirk, 2013-14 and Vale of Leithen, 2021-22 (0; Vale of Leithen, 2020-21)
Longest unbeaten run in a season 21;  Kelty Hearts, 2019–20
Most wins in a season 28; Bonnyrigg Rose, 2021-22
Fewest wins in a season 1; Hawick Royal Albert, 2017-18 and Vale of Leithen, 2021-22 (0; Vale of Leithen, 2020-21)
Most draws in a season 11; East Stirlingshire, 2021-22
Most defeats in a season 31; Vale of Leithen, 2021-22
Fewest defeats in a season1; Edinburgh City, 2014-15 and Kelty Hearts, 2019-20
Most goals scored in a season 107; East Stirlingshire, 2016-17
Fewest goals scored in a season 10; Vale of Leithen, 2021-22 (5; Vale of Leithen, 2020-21)
Most goals conceded in a season 166; Vale of Leithen, 2021-22
Fewest goals conceded in a season 12; East Kilbride, 2018-19 (4; Kelty Hearts, 2020-21)
Highest attendance 1,510; Kelty Hearts 3–2 Bonnyrigg Rose Athletic, 29 February 2020
Notes

Managers 

The longest-serving manager at a Lowland League club is Douglas Samuel, who has managed The Spartans since 2012. Spartans won the inaugural league title during the 2013-14 season and clinched their second title in 2018.

Civil Service Strollers boss Gary Jardine, Barry Ferguson, and Robbie Horn have guided their clubs to promotion to the SPFL.

East Kilbride have won the title twice with two different managers, Martin Lauchlan in 2017 and Stuart Malcolm in 2019.

Youth competitions 
The Lowlands Development League operates for the Under 20s youth teams of clubs in the Lowland, East of Scotland, South of Scotland and West of Scotland leagues, along with other invited SPFL clubs. Originally named the Lowland and East of Scotland Under 20 Development League when it began in 2014, this replaced an earlier Under 19 league run by the East of Scotland League. Matches are normally played on Friday nights.

The Under 20s league expanded to 31 teams for the 2019–20 season, split into two conferences, having already increased in size from 13 to 23 teams thanks to the addition of new clubs to the East of Scotland League in 2018–19.  A year later, the aborted 2020–21 season saw numbers increase to 68 along with the addition of three West Conferences due to the introduction of the West of Scotland League within the Scottish football pyramid.

For the 2021–22 season, a record number of 88 clubs are taking part, split across six Conferences. Petershill, Kilwinning Rangers, and Darvel later withdrew their team from the Development League.

Conference A
Alloa Athletic
Bonnyrigg Rose Athletic
Bonnyton Thistle
Broomhill
Caledonian Braves
Civil Service Strollers
Cumbernauld Colts
East Fife
East Kilbride
Edinburgh City
Gala Fairydean Rovers
Kelty Hearts
The Spartans
Stirling Albion
University of Stirling

Conference B
Armadale Thistle
Camelon Juniors
Edinburgh College
Edinburgh South
Edinburgh United
Edinburgh University
Glenrothes
Heriot-Watt University
Kennoway Star Hearts
Musselburgh Athletic
Penicuik Athletic
Preston Athletic
Sauchie Juniors
Whitehill Welfare

Conference C
Blackburn United
Craigroyston
Dalkeith Thistle
Dunipace
Fauldhouse United
Hill of Beath Hawthorn
Inverkeithing Hillfield Swifts
Jeanfield Swifts
Leith Athletic
Livingston United
Lothian Thistle Hutchison Vale
Newtongrange Star
Oakley United
Tynecastle

Conference D
Bellshill Athletic
Blantyre Victoria
Cambuslang Rangers
Carluke Rovers
East Kilbride Thistle
Forth Wanderers
Glasgow United
Glenvale
Harthill Royal
Kirkintilloch Rob Roy
Mid-Annandale
Shotts Bon Accord
St Peter's
St Roch's

Conference E
Ashfield
Benburb
BSC Glasgow
Clydebank
Drumchapel United
Gartcairn
Johnstone Burgh
Maryhill
Pollok
Rossvale
St Anthony's
St Cadoc's
Vale of Leven
Yoker Athletic

Conference F
Ardeer Thistle
Ardrossan Winton Rovers
Arthurlie
Auchinleck Talbot
Beith Juniors
Cumnock Juniors
Dalry Thistle
Irvine Meadow XI
Largs Thistle
Maybole Juniors
Neilston
Port Glasgow
Troon
Whitletts Victoria

Conference G
Bellshill Athletic
Blantyre Victoria
Easterhouse FA
East Kilbride Thistle
Forth Wanderers
Gartcairn
Kirkintilloch Rob Roy
Lanark United
Lochar Thistle
Newmains United
Royal Albert
Shotts Bon Accord
Wishaw

These clubs also take part in two cup competitions for both the Eastern (A, B, C) and Western (D, E, F,G) conferences, as well as a combined challenge cup. Prior to it becoming a competition for Under 18 teams in 2018 many also competed in the annual SFA Scottish Youth Cup.

Seasons
The Spartans won the first Lowlands Development League title in 2015. The title was then won by Preston Athletic in 2016, East Kilbride in 2017, and Heriot-Watt University in 2018.

From the 2018–19 season, the league was split into two conferences. Conference B winners Spartans won their second title after beating Conference A winners Kelty Hearts in a play-off match which determined the overall league champions.

Edinburgh City were declared champions of Conference A and University of Stirling champions of Conference B after the 2019-20 season was cut short due to the COVID-19 pandemic.

There was no league champion for 2020–21 as the season did not start due to the COVID-19 pandemic.

Lowland League Cup
This 16 team straight knock-out tournament takes place over four weekends at the end of the league season. The league champion has the right to withdraw from the competition to concentrate on the Scottish League Two play-offs.

Sponsorship
On 24 September 2013, the Scottish Sun newspaper announced it was sponsoring the league. The league was then sponsored by Ferrari Packaging on a two-year agreement, which was extended to cover the 2017–18 season. In August 2018, GeoSonic, the Alloa-based sonic drilling contractor, concluded a one-year deal to become the new title sponsor of the Scottish Lowland Football League for the 2018-19 season. On 4 March 2022, Clarke ePOS was announced as the league's title sponsor until the end of the 2022-23 season.

Media coverage
The league has its own podcast known as The Lowland League Catchup. As well as weekly previews to games, and reviews known as the Roundup.

On 19 September 2018, the SLFL agreed a comprehensive media partnership with RockSport Radio but this has since ended.

References

External links
 Official website
 Facebook
 Twitter

 
5
2013 establishments in Scotland
Sports leagues established in 2013
Football in the Scottish Borders
Football in Edinburgh
Football in Glasgow
Football in Stirling (council area)
Football in Dumfries and Galloway
Football in East Lothian
Football in South Lanarkshire
Football in Midlothian
Sco
Professional sports leagues in the United Kingdom
Scottish Lowlands